Macraspis clavata is a species of beetles of the family Scarabaeidae. It occurs in Brazil.

References

Scarabaeidae
Beetles described in 1789